"Mary Pickford" is a song written and produced by Mike Batt for the Georgian-born, British singer Katie Melua. It is Melua's tenth single and the second from her third album, Pictures. It was originally inspired by a daily facts calendar owned by Batt that one day featured the fact that Mary Pickford used to eat roses.

The lyrics talk about the 1910s film actress Mary Pickford and other founders of United Artists. Mentioned in the song are Douglas Fairbanks, Charlie Chaplin, D. W. Griffith, United Artists and Pickfair.

The song can be seen as a pastiche of the classic silent era Joseph H. Santly song At the Moving Picture Ball since they have a similar rhythm, similar subject matter and indeed they list the same silent-era movie stars. However, the song may also be seen as a simple literary archetype having nothing whatsoever to do with the Santly tune, and instead being a reflection upon things in life that, for whatever reason and with whatever lofty components assembled, never seem to work. Furthermore, since United Artists and its cadre were all of the same era and predominantly visible in their day, it's reasonable to conclude that any song written about the era would include Fairbanks, Pickford, Chaplin, et al, not as a borrowed vignette of someone else's work, but from the verified history.

References

External links
Katie Melua website
Katie Melua – 'Mary Pickford' interview YouTube

2007 singles
Katie Melua songs
Songs written by Mike Batt
Mary Pickford
Song recordings produced by Mike Batt
2007 songs
Songs about actors
Cultural depictions of Charlie Chaplin